Kim Jung Hwa (born June 10, 1987), better known by her stage name J.Fla, is a South Korean singer, music artist, songwriter, and YouTuber. She signed with GoodSen Entertainment, and THE UNIT LABEL

Music career 
On August 22, 2011, J.Fla created her YouTube channel, JFlaMusic, and uploaded her first song, a cover of Beyonce's "Halo". Over the next five months she uploaded 15 more cover songs.

Subsequently, on February 17, 2012, a collection of 8 tracks entitled "JFla's Cover 1" was released on the internet.

In mid-2013, she released her official debut album, an original EP titled Babo Kateun Story.

Then, from late 2014 to mid-2016, she released at least six additional EPs (mostly covers of songs in English, but also some original, Korean language songs).

Early in 2017, she released her first full-length covers album, Blossom. By November of the same year, she had released five additional EPs and her YouTube channel had surpassed 5 million subscribers.

80 tracks from more than 10 of her EPs were then re-released in April 2018 as Rose: The J.Fla Collection. Also during 2018, J.Fla released two all-new full-length albums, covering a diverse array of artists, including Taylor Swift, ABBA, The Chainsmokers, Ariana Grande, and Queen.

On November 16, 2018, J.Fla became the first independent South Korean YouTuber to achieve more than 10 million subscribers. As of March 2021, she has more than 17 million subscribers.

In late 2019, J.Fla released several new original songs with accompanying music videos, starting with "Good Vibe" on September 6.

In September of 2022, J.Fla announced the formation of her own record company, GOODSEN ENTERTAINMENT, based in South Korea. An original 10-track album was announced, with the lead single "Bedroom Singer" having its international debut on October 7 at 12:00 KST.

Discography

Collaborations 
 진돗개 feat. J.Fla - 틱톡 (Jin Doggae feat. J.Fla - Tic Toc) (August 14, 2013)

Singles and original songs 
 My Tiny Miracle (September 1, 2014)
 Why (February 16, 2015)
 너에게 닿기를 / Hoping To Reach You (May 2, 2016)
 Baby Baby Baby (June 13, 2016)
 Good Vibe (September 6, 2019)
 Are You My Villain (October 11, 2019)
 Starlight (November 8, 2019)

EPs and mini-albums 
 바보 같은 Story / Stupid Story / Foolish Story (July 26, 2013)
 화살 (Arrow) (December 15, 2014)
 Cover Sessions (November 27, 2015)
 찬란육리 / Merry (March 21, 2016)
 Cover Sessions 2 (April 29, 2016)
 Grey Skies (July 29, 2016)
 Say Something (February 16, 2017)
 Inspiration (February 24, 2017)
 Orchid (May 26, 2017)
 Gold (June 9, 2017)
 New Rules (November 21, 2017)

Albums 
 Blossom (March 10, 2017)
 Rose: The J.Fla Collection (April 26, 2018)
 Believer (August 17, 2018)
 Natural (December 7, 2018)

References

External links 
 J.Fla's Official Site

1987 births
Living people
Music YouTubers
21st-century South Korean women singers
South Korean women pop singers
South Korean YouTubers
English-language singers from South Korea